This is the complete list of Speedway World Pairs Championship medalists from 1970 to 1993.

Medalists

See also
 motorcycle speedway

!
Speedway Pairs World Championships